The 2019–20 Challenge Tour was a series of snooker tournaments that took place during the 2019–20 snooker season. The Challenge Tour was the second-tier tour for players not on the main World Snooker Tour. The top player in the final rankings earned a two-year card to the World Snooker Tour from the 2020–21 snooker season. The following eight players in the rankings progressed to a play-off event, with the winner of that event also receiving a two-year place on the World Snooker Tour. Two of the events were postponed: Event five was rearranged due to poor weather conditions, whilst the play-off was halted due to the COVID-19 pandemic.

Played between August and July, the series was contested over ten events. Ashley Hugill finished top of the rankings, winning two of the events. Hugill had already earned a place on the World Snooker Tour having won the 2020 WSF Open, so second placed Lukas Kleckers 
earned a tour card. Third ranked Andrew Pagett also received a place on the World Snooker Tour after his victory in the 2020 EBSA European Snooker Championship. Allan Taylor, who had finished seventh in the rankings, won the play-off tournament and a place on the World Snooker Tour.

Format 
The Challenge Tour is a series of ten snooker tournaments, featuring as a qualification route for the World Snooker Tour. Featuring 10 events across Europe, each tournament had 64 participants. The leading 56 players in the 2019 Q School Order of Merit who had not qualified for the main tour, as well as eight wildcards are eligible to play. If there are fewer than 64 entries, additional entries from the Q School Order of Merit could enter. All matches are for the original ten event were held as the best-of-five . The player with the most prize money from the ten events received participation for the World Snooker Tour for the 2020–21 and 2021–22 snooker season. A final event, the Challenge Tour play-off was held for the eight highest prize fund winners, who had not already received a tour card. The winner of the play-off, contested as the best-of-seven frames was also awarded a two-year tour card.

Prize fund
Each event featured a prize fund of £10,000 with the winner receiving £2,000.

 Winner: £2,000
 Runner-up: £1,000
 Semi-final: £700
 Quarter-final: £500
 Last 16: £200
 Last 32: £125
 Total: £10,000

Participants 
The leading 56 players in the 2019 Q School Order of Merit, excluding the 16 who qualified for the main tour, were automatically eligible to play.

  Ross Bulman
  Long Zehuang
  Yang Qingtian
  Lukas Kleckers
  Ian Preece
  Paul Davison
  Lin Shuai
  Hamza Akbar
  Andrew Pagett
  Allan Taylor
  Geng Mingqi
  Chae Ross
  Christopher Keogan
  Shane Castle
  Andreas Ploner
  Au Chi-wai
  Wang Zepeng
  Adam Duffy
  Robin Hull
  Sydney Wilson
  Daniel Womersley
  Ashley Hugill
  Callum Downing
  Kayden Brierley
  Callum Lloyd
  Simon Blackwell
  Guan Zhen
  Zak Surety
  Lee Richardson
  Rory McLeod
  Jamie McArdle
  Andy Marriott
  Ryan Thomerson
  Fang Xiongman
  Adrian Rosa
  Patrick Whelan
  Rodion Judin
  Andrew Doherty
  Michael Collumb
  Ka Wai Cheung
  Dean Young
  Sean Maddocks
  George Pragnell
  Matthew Glasby
  Himanshu Dinesh Jain
  Fergal Quinn
  Peter Devlin
  Matthew Couch
  Ryan Davies
  Aditya Mehta
  Amir Sarkhosh
  Michael Wild
  Iulian Boiko
  Lee Daegyu
  Alex Taubman

Summary

The first event was won by Ka Wai Cheung, who defeated Oliver Brown 3–1 in the final in Nuremberg, Germany. Jake Nicholson defeated Welshman Andrew Pagett in the second event, in Berkshire, England. Paggett then won the third event, defeating Robbie McGuigan 3–0 in the final. At the fourth event in Bruges, Belgium, Ashley Hugill defeated Aaron Hill 3–1. Allan Taylor won the fifth event, defeating Scottish player Michael Collumb in the final. Brown won the sixth tournament, defeating Hugill in Budapest, Hungary. Scottish 17-year-old Dean Young overcame Paggett in Pelt, Belgium. Lukas Kleckers completed a 3–1 win over Tyler Rees in Tamworth, England in event 8. Hugill won his second title in event 9 in Llanelli, Wales after a 3–1 win over Sydney Wilson. The final event was won by Adam Duffy, who beat Kuldesh Johal in Leicester, England.

Hugill finished the season as the highest ranked player, but had won the 2020 WSF Open, which gave him a place on the World Snooker Tour for the following two seasons. As such, second placed Lukas Kleckers qualified from the Challenge Tour to the main tour for the next two seasons. Third placed Andrew Pagett also received a tour card, having won the 2020 EBSA European Snooker Championship. The next eight highest ranked players took part in the play-off in Sheffield in England for a final World Snooker Tour place for the following two seasons. The play-off was postponed until August 2020 due to the COVID-19 pandemic, but was won by Taylor, who completed a 4–0 whitewash victory over Duffy.

Results
Below is the schedule for the eleven events.

Rankings 
Below is the leading 20 players in the prize money rankings over the series.

Notes

References 

Q Tour
2019 in snooker
2020 in snooker